Mascarose II of Armagnac (died 1254), was a Countess regnant suo jure of Armagnac and Fézensac in 1246-1254.

References

 « Fezenzac », dans Louis Charles Dezobry et Théodore Bachelet, Dictionnaire de Biographie et d’Histoire, vol. 1, Paris, 1863

1254 deaths
13th-century women rulers
Counts of Fézensac
Counts of Armagnac
Year of birth unknown